Stink Creek may refer to:

 Stink Creek (Nottely River tributary), a stream in Georgia
 Stink Creek (Grand River), a stream in North and South Dakota
 Stink Creek, polluted Georgia stream featured in the 2016 documentary Company Town
 Stink Creek, a stream running through Center Township, Clark County, Kansas
 Stink Creek, a tributary to the North Fork Malheur River in Oregon

See also
 Stinking Creek (disambiguation)